The Riddles of Amir Khusrow were developed during the royal courts of more than seven rulers of the Delhi Sultanate. During this time, Khusrow wrote not only many playful riddles, but songs and legends which have been a part of popular culture in South Asia ever since. Additionally, his riddles and songs and legends are considered to be an important early witness to the Hindustani language. His riddles in particular involve fun double entendre or, wordplay. Innumerable riddles by this poet are being passed through oral tradition for the past seven centuries with a notable increase in recent times. However, there is some debate about whether Khusrow was the real author of the riddles attributed to him; some riddles transmitted under his name concern subjects which did not exist in Khusrow's own time, such as the gun and hookah.

The collection contains 286 riddles, divided into six groups, 'apparently on the basis of the structure of the riddle and the structure of the answer'; 'these riddles are "in the style of the common people", but most scholars believe they were composed by Khusro'. The riddles are in Mātrika metre.

Examples

One sequence of the riddles is posed as a dialogue between a woman describing some mundane phenomenon and an interlocutor who imagines she is talking about sex, asking 'Who, girl, your man?' For example:
He visits my town once a year.
He fills my mouth with kisses and nectar.
I spend all my money on him.
Who, girl, your man?
No, a mango.

He stays up all night alone with me
and only leaves at the crack of dawn.
His departure breaks my heart.
Who, girl, your man?
No, an oil lamp.

Editions and translations
 Amir Khusrau Dehlavi, Jawahar-i-Khusravi, ed. by Rashid Ahmad Salim (Aligarh: Majmua-i-Rasail Institute Press, 1917).
 Brajratna Das, Khusro kī Hindī Kavitā (Kashi, 1922)
 Gopi Chand Narang, Amir  Khusrau  ka  Hindavi  Kalam (Delhi: Photo Offset Printer, 1987)
 In the Bazaar of Love: The Selected Poetry of Amīr Khusrau, trans. by Paul E. Losensky and Sunil Sharma (New Delhi: Penguin, 2011), pp. 114-16 (nos 74-78)
 Ankit Chadha, Amir Khusrau: The Man in Riddles (Gurgaon: Penguin, 2016) (popular adaptation of twenty riddles for children)

References

Riddles
Indian literature
Indian folklore
Hindustani language
Hindi-language literature
Urdu-language literature
Indian fairy tales